WVNE (760 AM) is a radio station broadcasting a Christian radio format. Licensed to Leicester, Massachusetts, United States, the station serves the Worcester area.  The station is owned by Blount Masscom, Inc. and features programming from the Salem Radio Network. The station's programming is also heard on translator station W268CQ (101.5 FM).

History
The station was assigned the call letters WVNE on February 2, 1984. The station signed on June 19, 1991.

Translator

References

External links

VNE
Radio stations established in 1991
Leicester, Massachusetts
Mass media in Worcester County, Massachusetts
1991 establishments in Massachusetts
VNE